Heptaptera is a genus of flowering plants belonging to the family Apiaceae.

Its native range is Southeastern Europe to Iran.

Species:

Heptaptera alata 
Heptaptera anatolica 
Heptaptera angustifolia 
Heptaptera anisopetala 
Heptaptera cilicica 
Heptaptera colladonioides 
Heptaptera macedonica 
Heptaptera triquetra

References

Apioideae
Apioideae genera